Alliance of Liberals and Democrats for Europe is a transnational political alliance.

Alliance of Liberals and Democrats for Europe may also refer to:

 Alliance of Liberals and Democrats for Europe group, the European Parliament group
 Alliance of Liberals and Democrats for Europe Party, the European political party
 Alliance of Liberals and Democrats for Europe in the Parliamentary Assembly of the Council of Europe
 Alliance of Liberals and Democrats for Europe in the European Committee of the Regions

See also 
 ALDE (disambiguation)